A department of transportation (DOT or DoT) is a government agency responsible for managing transportation. The term is primarily used in the United States to describe a transportation authority that coordinates or oversees transportation-related matters within its jurisdiction.

In the United States, the largest DOT is the United States Department of Transportation, a federal agency which oversees interstate travel and numerous other transportation agencies.

All U.S. states have their own DOTs, responsible for managing and overseeing transportation, transportation-related infrastructure, and transportation safety in their respective states. They provide enforcement through DOT officers within their respective jurisdictions.

List of U.S. state and insular area departments of transportation
Alabama Department of Transportation (ALDOT)
Alaska Department of Transportation and Public Facilities (DOT&PF)
Arizona Department of Transportation (ADOT)
Arkansas Department of Transportation (ARDOT)
California Department of Transportation (Caltrans)
Colorado Department of Transportation (CDOT)
Connecticut
Connecticut Department of Transportation (CTDOT) - roads, bridges, rail, public transit
Connecticut Airport Authority (CAA) - airports
Delaware Department of Transportation (DelDOT)
Florida Department of Transportation (FDOT)
Georgia Department of Transportation (GDOT)
Hawaii Department of Transportation (HDOT)
Idaho Transportation Department (ITD)
Illinois Department of Transportation (IDOT)
Indiana Department of Transportation (INDOT)
Iowa Department of Transportation (Iowa DOT)
Kansas Department of Transportation (KDOT)
Kentucky Transportation Cabinet (KYTC)
Louisiana Department of Transportation and Development (DOTD)
Maine Department of Transportation (MaineDOT)
Maryland Department of Transportation (MDOT)
Massachusetts Department of Transportation (MassDOT)
Michigan Department of Transportation (MDOT)
Minnesota Department of Transportation (MnDOT)
Mississippi Department of Transportation (MDOT)
Missouri Department of Transportation (MoDOT)
Montana Department of Transportation (MDT)
Nebraska
Nebraska Department of Transportation (NDOT) - roads, rail, and public transportation
Nebraska Department of Aeronautics - airports
Nebraska Game and Parks Commission - waterways
Nevada Department of Transportation (NDOT)
New Hampshire Department of Transportation (NHDOT)
New Jersey Department of Transportation (NJDOT)
New Mexico Department of Transportation (NMDOT)
New York
New York State Department of Transportation (NYSDOT)
New York State Thruway Authority (NYSTA)
New York State Bridge Authority (NYSBA)
North Carolina Department of Transportation (NCDOT)
North Dakota Department of Transportation (NDDOT)
Ohio Department of Transportation (ODOT)
Oklahoma Department of Transportation (ODOT)
Oregon Department of Transportation (ODOT)
Pennsylvania Department of Transportation (PennDOT)
Puerto Rico Department of Transportation and Public Works (DTOP)
Rhode Island
Rhode Island Department of Transportation (RIDOT)
Rhode Island Turnpike and Bridge Authority (RITBA) - toll bridges
South Carolina Department of Transportation (SCDOT)
South Dakota Department of Transportation (SDDOT)
Tennessee Department of Transportation (TDOT)
Texas Department of Transportation (TxDOT)
Utah Department of Transportation (UDOT)
Vermont Agency of Transportation (VTrans)
Virginia Department of Transportation (VDOT)
Washington State Department of Transportation (WSDOT)
West Virginia Department of Transportation (WVDOT)
Wisconsin Department of Transportation (WisDOT)
Wyoming Department of Transportation (WYDOT)

Local departments of transportation
Baltimore City Department of Transportation (BCDOT)
Charlotte Department of Transportation (CDOT)
Cincinnati Department of Transportation and Engineering (DOTE)
Chicago Department of Transportation (CDOT)
Detroit Department of Transportation (DDOT)
District Department of Transportation (d.DOT) (Washington, D.C.)
Los Angeles Department of Transportation (LADOT)
New York City Department of Transportation (NYCDOT)
Seattle Department of Transportation (SDOT)

Other countries 
Though the term "department of transportation" is most associated with the United States, the term has been used in various forms for other countries' transportation authorities.

 Department of Transportation – Philippines
 Department of Transport – Ireland
 Department of Transport – Tamil Nadu, India
 Department of Transportation and Infrastructure – New Brunswick, Canada
 Department of Transportation and Infrastructure Renewal – Nova Scotia, Canada
 Department of Transport and Planning – Victoria, Australia
 Department of Transportation, Communications and Infrastructure – Federated States of Micronesia

See also

Ministry of Transport – an equivalent used in countries that use the term "ministry"

References

External links 
 A list of U.S. state DOTs

 
Transportation government agencies of the United States